Midwives is a 2001 American television film, starring Sissy Spacek, Peter Coyote, Terry Kinney, Alison Pill and Piper Laurie. It was directed by Glenn Jordan. The film is based in the 1997 novel Midwives written by Chris Bohjalian. It was Lifetime's 100th Original Movie and had the highest rating in the network's history.

Plot
Sibyl Danforth, a midwife in rural Vermont, is charged with manslaughter in the death of one of her patients.

Cast
 Sissy Spacek as Sibyl Danforth
 Peter Coyote as Stephen Hastings
 Terry Kinney as Rand Danforth
 Alison Pill as Constance 'Connie' Danforth
 Piper Laurie as Cheryl Visco

Reception
Midwives got most favorable reviews from critics and was nominated for "Best Motion Picture Made for Television" in the 6th Golden Satellite Awards, but lost for The Day Reagan Was Shot.

Sissy Spacek was nominated for a Screen Actors Guild Award in the category of "Outstanding Performance by a Female Actor in a Television Movie or Miniseries" and a Satellite Award in the category of "Best Performance by an Actress in a Miniseries or a Motion Picture Made for Television", but lost both to Judy Davis in Life with Judy Garland: Me and My Shadows.

References

External links
 
 Midwives at Moviefone
 Midwives at TCM
 Midwives at Peter Coyote Official Website
 Midwives at British Film Institute

2001 films
American television films
2000s English-language films